Kjell Olav Opseth (2 January 1936 – 3 December 2017) was a Norwegian politician for the Labour Party. He was Minister of Transport and Communications 1990–1996 and Minister of Local Government Affairs 1996–1997. As Transport Minister, he once observed of advertising hoardings featuring model Anna Nicole Smith that "on her own [she] is not a traffic hazard. It depends where she is."

References

1936 births
2017 deaths
Members of the Storting
Labour Party (Norway) politicians
Ministers of Transport and Communications of Norway
Ministers of Local Government and Modernisation of Norway
21st-century Norwegian politicians
20th-century Norwegian politicians
People from Førde